Torrita is a locality situated on the section of the Mallee Highway and Pinnaroo railway line between Ouyen and the South Australian border in the Sunraysia region.  The place by road, is situated about 13 kilometres east from Underbool and 8 kilometres west from Walpeup.

A Post Office opened on 15 July 1912 when a regular mail service was provided by the opening of the railway from Ouyen to Murrayville a month earlier, but was known as Nyang until 1921 and closed in 1984. The name Nyang is preserved in the Nyang Flora Reserve to the south of the highway.

Nyang State School (No. 3871) opened in the public hall on 31 September 1914, and received a purpose-built one-room school in 1920. It was renamed Torritata State School on 20 October 1921. The school closed in 1969, and the building was later moved to Walpeup to be used as an artroom.

The area of the locality contains the smaller area of Kattyong, and to the south the smaller area of Gunner.

Kattyong State School (No. 3962) opened on 4 October 1917 and closed on 19 February 1967. Kattyong West State School (No. 4321) opened in May 1928 and closed in 1942, with the school building moved to Mittyack.

Notes and references

Towns in Victoria (Australia)
Mallee (Victoria)